The teams competing in Group 9 of the 2004 UEFA European Under-21 Championships qualifying competition were Italy, Serbia and Montenegro, Finland, Wales and Azerbaijan. Serbia and Montenegro began the campaign as the Federal Republic of Yugoslavia, but officially changed their name in February 2003.

Standings

* Match originally ended as a 1–0 victory for Wales, UEFA later awarded the match as a 3–0 forfeit win to Wales.

Matches
All times are CET.

Match originally ended as a 1–0 victory for Wales, UEFA later awarded the match as a 3–0 forfeit win to Wales.

Goalscorers
7 goals
 Alberto Gilardino

5 goals

 Marco Borriello
 Gaetano D'Agostino

4 goals
 Giuseppe Sculli

3 goals

 Mathias Lindström
 Igor Matić
 Dejan Milovanović

2 goals

 Pekka Lagerblom
 Daniel Sjölund
 Andrea Gasbarroni
 Cristian Zaccardo
 Marjan Marković

1 goal

 Alexei Eremenko
 Risto Ojanen
 Antti Okkonen
 Matteo Brighi
 Marko Baša
 Ivan Bošković
 Andrija Delibašić
 Dejan Kekezović
 Danko Lazović
 Nino Pekarić
 Branimir Petrović
 Srđan Radonjić
 Adam Birchall
 Kevin Gall
 Jamie Tolley
 David Vaughan

1 own goal
 Đorđe Jokić (playing against Finland)

External links
 Group 9 at UEFA.com

Group 9
Under